Simón Bolívar is a 1969 Spanish drama film directed by Alessandro Blasetti. Starring by Maximilian Schell as the Venezuelan military and political leader Simón Bolívar who helped much of Latin America to achieve independence from Spain. The film was entered into the 6th Moscow International Film Festival.

Cast
 Maximilian Schell as Simón Bolívar
 Rosanna Schiaffino as Consuelo Hernandez
 Francisco Rabal as José Antonio Del Llano
 Barta Barri
 Elisa Cegani as Conchita Diaz Moreno
 Ángel del Pozo
 Luis Dávila as Carlos
 Manuel Gil
 Sancho Gracia
 Tomás Henríquez as Negro Primero
 Julio Peña as señor Hernandez
 Conrado San Martín as gen. José Antonio Paez
 Fernando Sancho as Fernando Gonzales

References

External links
 

1969 films
1960s biographical drama films
1960s historical drama films
Films set in Colombia
Films set in Peru
Films set in South America
Films set in the 1810s
Films set in the 1820s
Films set in Venezuela
Italian biographical drama films
Italian historical drama films
Spanish biographical drama films
1960s Spanish-language films
Films directed by Alessandro Blasetti
Cultural depictions of Simón Bolívar
Spanish historical drama films
Venezuelan drama films
1960s Spanish films
1960s Italian films